Curtis Scott Cheek (born February 15, 1958) is an American bridge player. Cheek is from Huntsville, Alabama and is an aerospace engineer.

Cheek and the Dutch star Huub Bertens, who now resides in Oregon, have established a partnership that represented the United States in the SportAccord World Mind Games at Beijing in December 2014.

Bridge accomplishments

Wins
2019 Platinum Pairs,

Yeh Bros. Cup 2017
 North American Bridge Championships (5)
 Wernher Open Pairs (1) 2002 
 Nail Life Master Open Pairs (1) 2013 
 Vanderbilt (1) 2012 
 Keohane North American Swiss Teams (1) 2008 
 Reisinger (1) 2006

Runners-up

 North American Bridge Championships
 von Zedtwitz Life Master Pairs (1) 2002 
 Wernher Open Pairs (1) 1994 
 Nail Life Master Open Pairs (1) 1996 
 Grand National Teams (1) 1997 
 Jacoby Open Swiss Teams (1) 1997 
 Vanderbilt (1) 2011 
 Keohane North American Swiss Teams (1) 1999 
 Chicago Mixed Board-a-Match (1) 2001

References

External links
 

1958 births
American contract bridge players
Sportspeople from Huntsville, Alabama
Living people
Place of birth missing (living people)